Sandra Whyte-Sweeney (born August 24, 1970) is an American ice hockey player.

She won a gold medal at the 1998 Winter Olympics in Nagano, Japan. In the gold medal game, Whyte assisted on her team's first two goals and scored an empty-net goal to seal the United States' 3-1 win over Canada. It was the first gold medal awarded in women's ice hockey in Olympic history.

Career
Whyte-Sweeney has stayed connected to the Olympic movement. She participated in the United States Olympic Committee's Summit program. These are a series of conferences that unite former Olympic gold medalists with medal hopefuls for the next Games with the goal of helping them mentally prepare for the challenge.

References

1970 births
American women's ice hockey forwards
Harvard Crimson women's ice hockey players
Ice hockey players from Massachusetts
Ice hockey players at the 1998 Winter Olympics
Living people
Medalists at the 1998 Winter Olympics
Olympic gold medalists for the United States in ice hockey
People from Saugus, Massachusetts